The stellate reticulum is a group of cells located in the center of the enamel organ of a developing tooth.  These cells are star-shaped and synthesize glycosaminoglycans.  As glycosaminoglycans are produced, water is drawn in between the cells, stretching them apart.  As they are moved further away from one another, the stellate reticular cells maintain contact with one another through desmosomes, resulting in their unique appearance.
The stellate reticulum is lost after the first layer of enamel is laid down. This brings cells in the inner enamel epithelium closer to blood vessels at the periphery.

References
 Orbans Oral histology and embryology – 10th ed.
 Cate, A.R. Ten. Oral Histology: development, structure, and function. 5th ed. 1998. .
 Ross, Michael H., Gordon I. Kaye, and Wojciech Pawlina. Histology: a text and atlas. 4th edition. 2003. .

 
 Tooth development